Synaptocochlea asperulata is a species of sea snail, a marine gastropod mollusk in the family Trochidae, the top snails.

Description
The shell is haliotis-shaped with a convex back. It is  rufous-brown, ornamented with a broad white girdle. It is decussated by elevated rather close-set lines and oblique striae. The white spire is  posterior, rather prominent. The long aperture is oval.

References

External links
 Adams, A. (1850). An arrangement of Stomatellidae, including the characters of a new genus, and of several new species. Proceedings of the Zoological Society of London. 18 (1850): 29-40
 Blatterer H. (2019). Mollusca of the Dahab region (Gulf of Aqaba, Red Sea). Denisia. 43: 1-480
 To Encyclopedia of Life
 To World Register of Marine Species

asperulata
Gastropods described in 1850